Sylvain Alex Ovono (born 26 March 1976) is a retired Cameroonian footballer, who played as a forward.

Football career
Born in Yaoundé, Ovono began playing football in Europe in Turkey, starting with modest Sivasspor, then switching to the Süper Lig in the 1997–98 season, appearing very rarely for the last-placed team, Belediye Vanspor.

In the following decade, almost uninterrupted, he played in Portugal, mostly in the lower leagues. The best he achieved was appearing two seasons in the second division for Associação Naval 1º de Maio (only 12 matches over the course of two seasons combined). After a very brief spell in Greece, he resumed his career in the country, appearing for seven different clubs (notably Portimonense SC, when it was in the third level).

In 2001, Ovono had an unsuccessful trial at 1. FC Union Berlin in Germany. After returning to Portugal, he eventually retired at the age of 33, his last club being Grupo Desportivo Sourense in Soure.

References

External links

1976 births
Living people
Footballers from Yaoundé
Cameroonian footballers
Association football forwards
Süper Lig players
Sivasspor footballers
Vanspor footballers
Associação Naval 1º de Maio players
Portimonense S.C. players
S.C. Espinho players
S.C. Pombal players
S.C. Lusitânia players
G.D. Sourense players
Cameroonian expatriate footballers
Expatriate footballers in Turkey
Cameroonian expatriate sportspeople in Turkey
Expatriate footballers in Portugal
Cameroonian expatriate sportspeople in Portugal
Expatriate footballers in Greece
Cameroonian expatriate sportspeople in Greece